The 2007 Cape Verdean Football Championship season was the 28th of the competition of the first-tier football in Cape Verde. Its started on 12 May and finished on 21 July, earlier than the last season. The tournament was organized by the Cape Verdean Football Federation. Sporting would win their 6th title and second straight after defeating Académica do Mindelo under the away goals rule, the only time it happened, the scorer was Dário who scored their only goal at the finals during stoppage time. They would have entry to the 2008 CAF Champions League. No second place team would also participate in the 2008 CAF Confederation Cup

Overview 
Sporting Clube da Praia was the defending team of the title. A total of 12 clubs participated in the competition, one from each island league and one who won the last season's title. As Sporting Praia won the 2006 national title, Académica da Praia, runner-up of the island division would compete in the championships.

The season at the time would have the second club to win two back-to-back titles after CS Mindelense in 1976 and 1977.

Scorpion Vermelho was the first participant of the north of Santiago that came from the municipality of Santa Cruz.

The biggest win was Académico do Aeroporto who won 8-0 against Sporting from Porto Novo, the most goals was Académica do Mindelo. In the knockout stage, three of the four clubs would be with the name Académic-, The Battle of Académica would feature two homonymous clubs from Praia and Mindelo and the latter would win two goals (one per match).

Participating clubs 

 Sporting Clube da Praia, winner of the 2006 Cape Verdean Football Championships
 SC Sal Rei, winner of the Boa Vista Island League
 SC Morabeza, winner of the Brava Island League
 Vulcânicos FC, winner of the Fogo Island League
 Académica da Calheta, winner of the Maio Island League
 Académico do Aeroporto, winner of the Sal Island League
 Scorpion Vermelho, winner of the Santiago Island League (North)
 Académica da Praia, runner-up of the Santiago Island League (South)
 Rosariense, winner of the Santo Antão Island League (North)
 Sporting Clube do Porto Novo, winner of the Santo Antão Island League (South)
 FC Ultramarina, winner of the São Nicolau Island League
 Académica do Mindelo, winner of the São Vicente Island League

Information about the clubs

League standings 
 Group A 

 Group B

Results

Final Stages

Semi-finals

Finals 

Sporting Praia won all two legs under away goals rule and claimed the national title.

Statistics 
 Top scorer: Kadú: 9 goals (Académica do Mindelo)
 Biggest win: Académico Aeroporto 8-3 Sporting Porto Novo (May 12)

See also 
 2006–07 in Cape Verdean football
 2007 Cape Verdean Cup

Footnotes

External links 
 https://web.archive.org/web/20150924011016/http://www.fcf.cv/pt/
 2007 Cape Verdean Football Championships at RSSSF

Cape Verdean Football Championship seasons
1
Cape